Zikhona Mda (born 11 March), is a South African actress, voice-over artist, fashion designer and yoga instructor. She is best known for the roles in the films such as; Goodbye Bafana, Vagrant Queen and Amaza. She is also worked as a scriptwriter and production coordinator.

Personal life
Zikhona Mda was born on 11 March in Cape Town, South Africa.

Career
In 2004, she appeared in the fourth season of the SABC1 drama serial Interrogation Room with the role "Nthati" in an episode. In 2007, she joined with the SABC1 drama series Divers Down with the role "Buhle". In the same year, she acted in the blockbuster feature film Goodbye Bafana with the role "Zenani Mandela". In 2008, she acted in the third season of the e.tv sports drama serial Shooting Stars and played the role "Lehle". In 2009, she played the role "Zoliswa" in the SABC1 drama series Montana. She later reprised her role in the series due to its popularity.

In 2010, she starred in the BBC One police procedural serial Silent Witness in the thirteenth season by playing the role "Nyasha Mangidi" in two episodes. In 2014, she joined with the SABC1 drama series Amaza, where she played the supportive role "Thembi Kamva". Apart from that, she also made a cameo role in the two serials: Shooting Stars and Madam & Eve. She also performed in the stage plays such as; Herion Lies, The Real Inspector Hound, Who Killed The Real Biltong? and Mind Games. Meanwhile, she auditioned for both the 2012 & 2015 Presenter Search On 3 seasons and finally selected for "Top 10 Finalists" in 2018 season.

Filmography

References

External links
 IMDb

Living people
South African film actresses
South African television actresses
South African stage actresses
Year of birth missing (living people)